Carabus regalis is a species of beetle from the family Carabidae, found in Mongolia and Russia.

References

regalis
Beetles described in 1822